Steven Caras: See Them Dance is a public television documentary directed by Deborah Novak.  It concerns the life and work of former New York City Ballet dancer, Steven Caras, who drew upon his practical experience as a dancer to become a perceptive dance photographer.  Focusing on Caras' difficulties in becoming a professional dancer, the film explores the complexities of ballet and profiles the father of ballet in America, George Balanchine.

Synopsis

Against a backdrop of the ballet world in the 1960s and 1970s, this feature-length documentary traces the life and times of dancer/photographer Steven Caras. Despite bullying at school and parental rejection at home, Caras pursued his dream of becoming a dancer and was invited by George Balanchine to join the New York City Ballet. Balanchine also took note of Caras's talent as a photographer and granted him privileged access to photograph all aspects of City Ballet's private world.  Ultimately, Caras created over 100,000 images including "Last Bow" depicting Balanchine's final curtain call.

Interviews

Dancers and choreographers interviewed include Peter Martins, Jacques D'Amboise, Mia Michaels, Allegra Kent, Patricia McBride, Jean-Pierre Bonnefoux, Sean Lavery, Elizabeth Streb, Virginia Johnson, and Gary Chryst. Comments on the historical importance of Caras' photographs are provided by Terry Teachout, Sara Morthland, and Jacqueline Davis.

Credits

Produced by Witek & Novak, Inc.
Directed by Deborah Novak
Executive Producer, Scott Wallin, Arizona PBS
Videographers - Paul Piasecki, Adam Shanker
Music - Jay Flippin
Editor and Technical Director - Eric Himes
Art Direction and Digital Effects - Carol Delgrosso

References

Staff members, Houston Chronicle, 27 April 2012.

Public television in the United States
Documentary films about ballet
Documentary films about photographers